El-Kanemi Warriors Football Club is a football team based in Maiduguri, Borno State, Nigeria. They play at El-Kanemi Stadium. They ended their 2005, season in the lower half of the Nigeria Premier League.They were relegated to the Nigeria Division 1 in 2007. 

In 2012, the El-Kanemi Warriors were promoted back to the top level. Due to the Boko Haram insurgency, in 2014 they played their home games in Kano. From 2015 to 2016, they hosted their home games at the Muhammadu Dikko Stadium in Katsina before returning to Maiduguri and El-Kanemi Stadium.
On October 17, 2017, the club announced former Enugu Rangers coach, Imama Amapakabo as their new coach on a one-year deal.

Achievements
Nigerian FA Cup: 2
1991, 1992

National Second Division: 2
1991, 2000

Performance in CAF competitions
CAF Cup Winners' Cup: 2 appearances
1992 – First Round
1993 – Semi-finals

Current squad
As of 17 April 2019

External links
Club logo

 
Football clubs in Nigeria
Maiduguri
Association football clubs established in 1986
1986 establishments in Nigeria
Sports clubs in Nigeria